Grant Township is a township in Greene County, Iowa, USA.

History
Grant Township was established in 1877. It is named for former President of the United States Ulysses S. Grant.

References

Townships in Greene County, Iowa
Townships in Iowa
1877 establishments in Iowa
Populated places established in 1877